The  is a branch of the National Diet Library in Japan, which provides library services specializing in children's books. It was established in 2000 as Japan's first national library specializing in children's books.

It is the center and international hub of children's books-related library services in Japan, including the collection, preservation and provision of children's books and literature related to children's books inside and outside Japan. The facility is located in Ueno Park, Taito-ku, Tokyo, and uses the former Imperial Library building built in 1906.

Buildings
The new "Arch Building", to designs by Tadao Ando and Nikken Sekkei, dates from 2015.

References

External Link
 International Library of Children's Literature 

2000 establishments in Japan
Libraries established in 2000
Libraries in Tokyo
Buildings of the Meiji period
Buildings and structures in Taitō
Tadao Ando buildings